The 1910–11 Luxembourg National Division was the second season of top level association football in Luxembourg.

Overview
It was performed by 4 teams, and Sporting Club Luxembourg won the championship.

League standings

Final

|}

References
Luxembourg - List of final tables (RSSSF)

1910-11
1910–11 in European association football leagues
Nat